Byron Briske (born January 23, 1976) is a Canadian former professional ice hockey defenceman.

Briske was drafted 80th overall by the Mighty Ducks of Anaheim in the 1994 NHL Entry Draft, having played junior hockey in the Western Hockey League for the Victoria Cougars and the Red Deer Rebels and later played for the Tri-City Americans. He was signed by the Mighty Ducks in 1996 and spent three seasons playing in the American Hockey League, beginning with the Baltimore Bandits for one season before their relocation to Cincinnati, Ohio in which they became the Cincinnati Mighty Ducks, where he played for two seasons. He signed with the Montreal Canadiens in 1999, but spent the 1999–00 season playing in the AHL for the Quebec Citadelles as well as the International Hockey League for the Detroit Vipers and the Long Beach Ice Dogs. It was with the Vipers that Briske scored the only goal in his professional career. The 1999–00 season would be his last as a professional.

Since retiring, Briske has gone on to become a financial advisor and currently works for Assante Wealth Management.

Career statistics

References

External links

1976 births
Living people
Anaheim Ducks draft picks
Baltimore Bandits players
Canadian ice hockey defencemen
Cincinnati Mighty Ducks players
Detroit Vipers players
Long Beach Ice Dogs (IHL) players
Quebec Citadelles players
Red Deer Rebels players
Tri-City Americans players
Victoria Cougars (WHL) players
Ice hockey people from Saskatchewan